Cities and towns under the oblast's jurisdiction:
Ivanovo (Иваново) (administrative center)
city districts:
Frunzensky (Фрунзенский)
Leninsky (Ленинский)
Oktyabrsky (Октябрьский)
Sovetsky (Советский)
Furmanov (Фурманов)
Kineshma (Кинешма)
Shuya (Шуя)
Teykovo (Тейково)
Vichuga (Вичуга)
Districts:
Furmanovsky (Фурмановский)
with 5 selsovets under the district's jurisdiction.
Gavrilovo-Posadsky (Гаврилово-Посадский)
Towns under the district's jurisdiction:
Gavrilov Posad (Гаврилов Посад)
Urban-type settlements under the district's jurisdiction:
Petrovsky (Петровский)
with 4 selsovets under the district's jurisdiction.
Ilyinsky (Ильинский)
Urban-type settlements under the district's jurisdiction:
Ilyinskoye-Khovanskoye (Ильинское-Хованское)
with 12 selsovets under the district's jurisdiction.
Ivanovsky (Ивановский)
Towns under the district's jurisdiction:
Kokhma (Кохма)
with 11 selsovets under the district's jurisdiction.
Kineshemsky (Кинешемский)
Towns under the district's jurisdiction:
Navoloki (Наволоки)
with 11 selsovets under the district's jurisdiction.
Komsomolsky (Комсомольский)
Towns under the district's jurisdiction:
Komsomolsk (Комсомольск)
with 5 selsovets under the district's jurisdiction.
Lezhnevsky (Лежневский)
Urban-type settlements under the district's jurisdiction:
Lezhnevo (Лежнево)
with 7 selsovets under the district's jurisdiction.
Lukhsky (Лухский)
Urban-type settlements under the district's jurisdiction:
Lukh (Лух)
with 6 selsovets under the district's jurisdiction.
Palekhsky (Палехский)
Urban-type settlements under the district's jurisdiction:
Palekh (Палех)
with 9 selsovets under the district's jurisdiction.
Pestyakovsky (Пестяковский)
Urban-type settlements under the district's jurisdiction:
Pestyaki (Пестяки)
with 5 selsovets under the district's jurisdiction.
Privolzhsky (Приволжский)
Towns under the district's jurisdiction:
Plyos (Плёс)
Privolzhsk (Приволжск)
with 9 selsovets under the district's jurisdiction.
Puchezhsky (Пучежский)
Towns under the district's jurisdiction:
Puchezh (Пучеж)
with 4 selsovets under the district's jurisdiction.
Rodnikovsky (Родниковский)
Towns under the district's jurisdiction:
Rodniki (Родники)
with 13 selsovets under the district's jurisdiction.
Savinsky (Савинский)
Urban-type settlements under the district's jurisdiction:
Arkhipovka (Архиповка)
Savino (Савино)
with 4 selsovets under the district's jurisdiction.
Shuysky (Шуйский)
Urban-type settlements under the district's jurisdiction:
Kolobovo (Колобово)
with 7 selsovets under the district's jurisdiction.
Teykovsky (Тейковский)
Urban-type settlements under the district's jurisdiction:
Nerl (Нерль)
with 9 selsovets under the district's jurisdiction.
Verkhnelandekhovsky (Верхнеландеховский)
Urban-type settlements under the district's jurisdiction:
Verkhny Landekh (Верхний Ландех)
with 3 selsovets under the district's jurisdiction.
Vichugsky (Вичугский)
Urban-type settlements under the district's jurisdiction:
Kamenka (Каменка)
Novopistsovo (Новописцово)
Staraya Vichuga (Старая Вичуга)
with 9 selsovets under the district's jurisdiction.
Yuryevetsky (Юрьевецкий)
Towns under the district's jurisdiction:
Yuryevets (Юрьевец)
with 6 selsovets under the district's jurisdiction.
Yuzhsky (Южский)
Towns under the district's jurisdiction:
Yuzha (Южа)
with 11 selsovets under the district's jurisdiction.
Zavolzhsky (Заволжский)
Towns under the district's jurisdiction:
Zavolzhsk (Заволжск)
with 12 selsovets under the district's jurisdiction.

References

Ivanovo Oblast
Ivanovo Oblast